The Prison Services (Operational Duties) Long Service and Good Conduct Medal was established by Royal Warrant on 17 December 2010.  The medal is awarded for long service to members of the various prison services of the United Kingdom.

Criteria
To qualify for the medal, a recipient must have served on operational prison duties for twenty years. This service can be either continuous or aggregated, and can include both full and part-time service. Those who move to non-operational Prison Service duties due to injury can also receive the medal after a total of twenty years service. There is no provision for ribbon clasps to recognise further periods of service.

Prison officers with a minimum of 25 years service were previously eligible for the Imperial Service Medal on retirement. As they cover the same service, the introduction of the Prison Services Medal meant that operational prison staff ceased to be eligible for the Imperial Service Medal.

Appearance
The Prison Services (Operational Duties) Long Service and Good Conduct Medal is circular,  in diameter, and made of cupro-nickel. The obverse, designed by Ian Rank-Broadley, bears an effigy of Queen Elizabeth II with the wording ELIZABETH II DEI GRATIA REGINA FID DEF. The reverse depicts a prison doorway with a crowned Royal Cypher. Above the design is the inscription FOR EXEMPLARY SERVICE.  The name and details of the recipient are impressed on the rim of the medal.

References

Civil awards and decorations of the United Kingdom
Awards established in 2010
Long and Meritorious Service Medals of Britain and the Commonwealth
2010 establishments in the United Kingdom
Penal system in the United Kingdom
Prison officer awards